The 2018–19 TSG 1899 Hoffenheim season is the 120th season in the football club's history and 11th consecutive and overall season in the top flight of German football, the Bundesliga, having been promoted from the 2. Bundesliga in 2008. In addition to the domestic league, 1899 Hoffenheim also are participating in this season's editions of the domestic cup, the DFB-Pokal, and the first-tier continental cup, the UEFA Champions League. This is the 11th season for Hoffenheim in the Wirsol Rhein-Neckar-Arena, located in Sinsheim, Baden-Württemberg, Germany. The season covers a period from 1 July 2018 to 30 June 2019.

Players

Squad information

Competitions

Overview

Bundesliga

League table

Results summary

Results by round

Matches

DFB-Pokal

UEFA Champions League

Group stage

Statistics

Appearances and goals

|-
! colspan=14 style=background:#dcdcdc; text-align:center| Goalkeepers

|-
! colspan=14 style=background:#dcdcdc; text-align:center| Defenders

|-
! colspan=14 style=background:#dcdcdc; text-align:center| Midfielders

|-
! colspan=14 style=background:#dcdcdc; text-align:center| Forwards

|-
! colspan=14 style=background:#dcdcdc; text-align:center| Players transferred out during the season

|-

References

TSG 1899 Hoffenheim seasons
Hoffenheim
Hoffenheim